2001 in philosophy

Events 
 Saul Kripke was awarded the Rolf Schock Prize in Logic and Philosophy "for his creation of the modal-logical semantics that bear his name and for his associated original and profound investigations of identity, reference and necessity".

Publications 
 Christopher Hitchens, Letters to a Young Contrarian (2001)
 Alain Finkielkraut, The Internet, The Troubling Ecstasy (2001)
 John A. Leslie, Infinite Minds: A Philosophical Cosmology (2001)
 Mario Bunge, Philosophy in Crisis: The Need for Reconstruction (2001)

Introductory Books 
 Michael Williams, Problems Of Knowledge: A Critical Introduction to Epistemology (2001)

Deaths 
 January 5 - G. E. M. Anscombe (born 1919)
 February 9 - Herbert A. Simon (born 1916)
 February 24 - Claude Shannon (born 1916)
 April 24 - Paul Thieme (born 1905)
 May 28 - Francisco Varela (born 1946)
 June 28 - Mortimer J. Adler (born 1902)
 August 12 - Pierre Klossowski (born 1905)
 September 30 - John C. Lilly (born 1915)
 October 14 - David Lewis (born 1941)
 December 20 - Léopold Sédar Senghor (born 1906)

References 

Philosophy
21st-century philosophy
Philosophy by year